Sivali was Queen of Anuradhapura in the 1st century, who reigned during the year 35 CE after the death of her brother Chulabhaya. When she enthroned she was an unmarried girl but had ability to keep that position steadily. But she was only able to rule Anuradhapura for four months until she was overthrown by king Amandagamini's nephew, Ilanaga.

See also
 List of Sri Lankan monarchs
 History of Sri Lanka

References

External links
 Kings & Rulers of Sri Lanka
 Codrington's Short History of Ceylon

Sinhalese queens
Monarchs of Anuradhapura
S
S
 Sinhalese Buddhist monarchs
1st-century women rulers